Oost-Souburg is a town in the municipality of Vlissingen in the province of Zeeland, Netherlands.

History 
The village was first mentioned in 1162 as Sutburch, and used to mean "southern fortified place", because it was the most southern of three defensive structures to defend against the Vikings. Oost (east) was added later to distinguish from West-Souburg. Oost-Souburg developed around the 9th century walled fortification. The fortification was abandoned in the 10th century.

The tower of the Dutch Reformed church was built in the early-14th century. The nave was built in the 15th century. It was damaged during the Dutch Revolt in 1572 and restored between 1582 and 1583. The choir was demolished during the restoration. The tower was enlarged in the 19th century.

Oost-Souburg was a separate municipality until 1836, when it merged with West-Souburg to create the new municipality of Oost- en West-Souburg. In 1840, it was home to 469 people. In 1873, the Canal through Walcheren was dug and the town was split into Oost- and West-Souburg.

In 1966, the town became part of the municipality of Vlissingen.

Notable people 
Oost-Souburg is the birthplace of former Ajax en Dutch international football-player Danny Blind.

Transportation 
In 1872, a railway station opened on the Vlissingen to Roosendaal railway line. It closed in 1945. In 1986, a new station opened which was named Vlissingen-Souburg.

Gallery

References

Populated places in Zeeland
Former municipalities of Zeeland
Vlissingen